This is a list of diplomatic missions accredited to Chad.  At present, the capital city of N'Djamena hosts 26 embassies, while other countries have envoys resident in other capitals who are also accredited to Chad.

Diplomatic missions in N'Djamena

Embassies

Other missions or delegations 
  (Delegation)
  (Embassy office)
  (Cooperation office & consular agency)

Consular missions

Moundou 
  (Consulate)

Non-resident embassies 
Resident in Abuja, Nigeria:

 
 
 
 
 
 
 
 
  

Resident in Khartoum, Sudan:

 
 
 
 

Resident in Tripoli, Libya:

 
 
 
 
 

Resident in Yaoundé, Cameroon:

 
 
 
 
 
 
 
 

Resident in other cities:

  (Addis Ababa)
  (Cairo)
  (Paris)
  (Niamey)
  (Ouagadougou)
  (Kinshasa)
  (Niamey)
  (New York)
  (Addis Ababa)
  (Libreville)
  (Cairo)
  (Bamako)
  (Algiers)
  (Kinshasa)

See also
 Foreign relations of Chad

Notes

External links 
 N'Djamena Diplomatic List

References

Diplomatic missions
Chad
Diplomatic missions